mercy is the twelfth studio album by guitarist and songwriter Trey Anastasio, released on March 11, 2022. It is his first fully acoustic album and was produced by Bryce Goggin and Robert Stevenson.

Background

mercy is Anastasio's second album recorded during the COVID–19 pandemic, after 2020's Lonely Trip, and is seen as a companion to that album. He has said that he intends to implement the songs on the album into Phish's repertoire in the near future.

Anastasio felt that the songs needed to be heard in sparse arrangements, saying in the liner notes: 

On the album, Anastasio used a custom-made acoustic guitar commissioned by Phish keyboardist Page McConnell as a birthday gift. Some songs on the album include more than one guitar part, overlaid on top of an existing part, with Anastasio explaining:

Track listing

Personnel

Trey Anastasio – all instruments and vocals

References

2022 albums
Trey Anastasio albums
Albums produced by Bryce Goggin
Rubber Jungle Records albums